Mælifell is a volcano located in Southern Iceland.

Mælifell stands 200 meters above its surroundings and it is a composite cone volcano formed by volcanic eruptions underneath the Myrdalsjökull glacier. Mælifell has surfaced ca 10,000 years ago as glaciers receded after the last ice age.

Apart from walkling, Mount Mælifell is reachable only by a 4WD vehicle. It is on the southern Fjallabak road next to the glacier Mýrdalsjökull. The road is usually wet and sometimes completely flooded, making the volcano only accessible from July to the beginning of October.

References

Mountains of Iceland
Stratovolcanoes
Volcanoes of Iceland